The 1968 Troy State Red Wave football team represented Troy State University as a member of the Alabama Collegiate Conference (ACC) during the 1968 NAIA football season. Led by second-year head coach Billy Atkins, the Red Wave finished the season with an 11–1 record and advanced to the NAIA playoffs. Troy State defeated , 43–35, in the NAIA National Championship Game to secure the program's first national championship. The Red Wave played their home games at Veterans Memorial Stadium in Troy, Alabama.

Schedule

References

Troy State
Troy Trojans football seasons
NAIA Football National Champions
Alabama Collegiate Conference football champion seasons
Troy State Red Wave football